The First Ukrainian International Bank or FUIB (Ukrainian: Перший Український Міжнародний Банк) is one of the leading Ukrainian banks, largely owned by the oligarch Rinat Akhmetov associated SCM Holdings. It was founded in 1991 and has its main office in Kyiv, Ukraine. As of January 1, 2018, the bank serves 1.2 million private and more than 40,000 corporate clients.

History
The First Ukrainian International Bank was founded on 20 November 1991, registered with the National Bank of Ukraine on 23 December 1991. In April 1992 the Bank started its banking operations. In 1995 the Bank began its cooperation with the European Bank for Reconstruction and Development (the “EBRD”) and in 1996 - with Deutsche Investitions-und Entwicklungsgesellschaft MbH (“DEG”). In 1999 each of DEG, the EBRD and International Finance Corporation (“IFC”), became shareholders with 10% holding. In 2000 Fortis Bank became a shareholder as legal successor of Bank Mees & Hope N.V. The bank was also the first Ukrainian bank to institute IFRS financial reporting (in 1991) and one of the first to obtain a credit rating from an international credit rating agency (Fitch in 1998). 

FUIB has been a principal member of payment systems Visa since 1996 and Mastercard International since 1993 and a regular participant of the State Retail Deposit Insurance Fund. In January 2022, the bank plans to launch a service of SWIFT payment to a broker in the United States to buy/sell securities on the US stock market through the application of a partner company, said Oleksandr Shcherbakha, Director of the Bank's Retail Sales and Development Department.

Shareholders 
The controlling shareholder of the bank is the Rinat Akhmetov associated SCM Finance (92.24% of shares), which is 100% owned by SCM Group. FUIB holds nostro accounts with 37 banks, while 61 banks hold vostro accounts with FUIB.

General info 
As of March 2012, Moody's rating for FUIB is stable. FUIB is presented by 168 outlets throughout Ukraine.  The Bank has been a member of various organizations, for instance,  of the Society for Worldwide Interbank Financial Telecommunication (“SWIFT”) since 1993. In 2001 the Bank joined the Ukrainian First Stock Trading System (PFTS). In December 2010 Central bank of Ukraine approved a reorganization plan of Dongorbank by means of merging two banks and accession Dongorbank to FUIB. On July 16, 2011 a consolidation of First Ukrainian International Bank (FUIB) and Dongorbank was completed and starting from July 18 the combined bank actives work under a joint brand FUIB.

Controversy
According to Serhiy Leshchenko in 2017, both Phil Griffin and Leonid Avrashov, who are associates of Paul Manafort, had credit cards with First Ukrainian International Bank. According to Mustafa Nayyem in 2007, Leonid Avrashov headed Black, Manafort, Stone and Kelly's Saint Petersburg office. On September 2, 2014, Manafort stated that Avrashov was with the International Republican Institute.

See also 
List of banks in Ukraine

References

External links 
 
 System Capital Management - official website

SCM Holdings
Banks of Ukraine
Banks established in 1991